Taione Richard Evumena "Tai" Sodje (born 20 September 2003) is an English professional footballer currently playing as a forward for Manchester City.

Club career
Born in Sheffield to an English mother and Nigerian father, Sodje began his footballing career with local side Sheffield United, before a switch to Premier League side Manchester City in 2015. He signed a professional contract with Manchester City in July 2021. Despite suffering an injury in late October 2021, which he described as the worst moment of his career, he returned to action for Manchester City's youth teams in April 2022.

International career
Eligible to represent both England and Nigeria, Sodje reportedly turned down an invitation to the England under-19 squad in October 2021. He was quoted in May 2022 as saying he would choose to represent whichever nation approached him first.

Style of play
Described by Manchester City as a "prolific goal-scorer" and a "versatile striker [who] can also operate to impressive effect on both the right or left flanks", Sodje describes himself as a "goal scorer", capable of playing "across the front three".

Personal life
Sodje is the son of former professional rugby league player Bright Sodje, and the nephew of former Nigerian international footballers Efe and Sam Sodje.

Career statistics

Club

Notes

References

2003 births
Living people
Footballers from Sheffield
English people of Nigerian descent
English footballers
Association football forwards
Sheffield United F.C. players
Manchester City F.C. players
Black British sportspeople